Horace Young may refer to:

 H. Olin Young (1850–1917), politician from the U.S. state of Michigan
 Horace C. Young (1806–1879), American architect and politician from New York
 Horace Alexander Young, African-American saxophonist and flute player